Garibaldi Spighi (11 June 1891 – 9 July 1978) was an Italian horse rider who competed in the 1920 Summer Olympics. In 1920 he and his horse Otello won the silver medal in the team eventing after finishing fifth in the individual eventing competition. He also finished tenth with his horse Virginia in the individual jumping event.

References

External links
 

1891 births
1978 deaths
Italian event riders
Italian show jumping riders
Olympic equestrians of Italy
Italian male equestrians
Equestrians at the 1920 Summer Olympics
Olympic silver medalists for Italy
Olympic medalists in equestrian
Medalists at the 1920 Summer Olympics